Fuck You, Aloha, I Love You is a collection of poems by Juliana Spahr. First published by Wesleyan University Press in 2001.

References 

American poetry collections